Włodzimierz Schmidt (born 10 April 1943) is a Polish chess grandmaster.

He played for Poland 14 times in Chess Olympiads between 1962 and 1994.
He was Polish Champion seven times: in 1971, 1974, 1975, 1981, 1988, 1990 and 1994.

In tournaments, Schmidt won or tied for 1st at Lublin 1970, Polanica Zdrój 1973,  Malmö 1977, Bagneux 1980, Polanica Zdrój 1981, Smederevo 1981 and Vinkovci 1986.

He was awarded the IM title in 1968 and the GM title in 1976. In 2004, Schmidt was awarded the title of FIDE Senior Trainer.

References

External links 
 
 

1943 births
Living people
Chess grandmasters
Chess coaches
Polish chess players
Sportspeople from Poznań